Mark Knowles and Daniel Nestor were the defending champions, but lost in the final to Michaël Llodra and Fabrice Santoro.

Seeds

Draw

Finals

Top half

Section 1

Section 2

Bottom half

Section 3

Section 4

External links
 2003 Australian Open – Men's draws and results at the International Tennis Federation
 Draw

Men's Doubles
Australian Open (tennis) by year – Men's doubles